USS R-10 (SS-87) was an R-class coastal and harbor defense submarine of the United States Navy.

Construction and commissioning
R-10′s keel was laid down on 21 March 1918 by the Fore River Shipbuilding Company in Quincy, Massachusetts. She was launched 28 June 1919, sponsored by Mrs. Philip C. Ransom, and commissioned on 20 August 1919.

Service history

1919–1930
Fitted out at Boston, Massachusetts, during the fall of 1919, R-10 joined Submarine Division 9 with the new year, 1920, and departed for winter maneuvers in the Gulf of Mexico on 15 January.  Based at Pensacola, Florida, she completed final trials during March and in mid-April returned to New England. On 18 May she arrived at Newport, Rhode Island and, given hull classification symbol SS-87 in July, operated out of there and New London, Connecticut. With the fall she proceeded south again, underwent overhaul at Norfolk, Virginia, remaining until April 1921. She then headed for the Panama Canal and duty in the Pacific.

R-10 arrived at San Pedro, California, on 30 June for a two-year tour.  Toward the end of September, she added salvage operations to her record as she assisted  in raising  from the bottom of San Pedro Harbor on 13 October, then resumed individual and squadron exercises. In July 1923, the R-boat shifted to Pearl Harbor where, for the next seven and a half years she conducted training operations, including fleet problems, made occasional runs as far west as Midway Island and as far east as the West Coast, and participated in air-sea rescue operations for planes initiating transpacific air travel. Ordered back to the Atlantic in 1930, R-10 cleared Pearl Harbor for the last time on 12 December.

1931–1939
On 9 February 1931, R-10 arrived at New London and assumed training duties for the Submarine School there. During the spring, she underwent overhaul at Portsmouth, New Hampshire, and in the summer added ASW destroyer training and NROTC cruises to her mission. Through the decade she continued her role as a training submarine and operated primarily off the New England coast with occasional temporary duty at stations on the mid-Atlantic seaboard, including the Diving School at Piney Point, Maryland, in May 1937.

1940–1946
In September 1940, R-10 participated in Bureau of Ordnance tests at Norfolk, then returned to New London. The following year she was transferred to Key West, Florida. From 1941 until the winter of 1943, she alternated patrols in the Yucatán Channel and the Florida Straits with operations for the Fleet Sonar School at Key West. Then, for the remainder of World War II, she concentrated on training duties. During February and into March 1945 she operated out of Port Everglades, Florida, then returned to Key West where she remained until 4 June.  On that date R-10 headed north for Philadelphia, and inactivation. Arriving on 8 June, she decommissioned on 18 June and was struck from the Naval Vessel Register on 11 July. In January 1946 she was sold for scrap to the North American Smelting Company in Philadelphia.

Awards
American Defense Service Medal with "Fleet" clasp
American Campaign Medal
World War II Victory Medal

References

External links
 

United States R-class submarines
World War II submarines of the United States
Ships built in Quincy, Massachusetts
1919 ships